The Copa Latina (Latin Cup) is a tournament organized by the Peruvian Volleyball Federation and Frecuencia Latina. This tournament serves as preparation for women national teams from all over the world to different Volleyball competitions, mainly the Pan-American Volleyball Cup. The Cup features Peru's national team and three invitees, the first two Cups only had teams from the Americas but since the third cup, European and Asian teams are invited also.

The format of the Cup has remained the same since the first edition, a preliminary round with a round-robin system between all four teams, the two top teams play the finals while the two bottom teams play for the bronze.

History

See also
Peru women's national volleyball team
Liga Nacional Superior de Voleibol

References

External links
 Federación Peruana de Voleibol 

Volleyball in Peru
International women's volleyball competitions
Recurring sporting events established in 2009